Joe Archer (20 May 1877 – 13 June 1969) was an Australian rules footballer who played with Carlton in the Victorian Football League (VFL). Although born in Victoria, he was recruited to Carlton from the Rovers Football Club of Western Australia, which played in what is now the West Australian Football League (WAFL). After leaving Carlton, he transferred to Essendon Town in the Victorian Football Association (VFA).

Notes

External links 
		
Joe Archer's profile at Blueseum
 

1877 births
1969 deaths
Australian rules footballers from Victoria (Australia)
Carlton Football Club players
Essendon Association Football Club players
Rovers Football Club players
People from Diamond Creek, Victoria
Australian rules footballers from Western Australia